Suresh Prabhakar Prabhu (born 11 July 1953) is an Indian politician, India's Sherpa to the G7 and Chancellor of  Rishihood University. who was the  Minister of Civil Aviation, Railways, Commerce & Industry in the First Modi ministry.

He is a Chartered Accountant by profession and a member of the Institute of Chartered Accountants of India (ICAI). From 1996, Prabhu retained the seat as a Member of Parliament for the Rajapur Lok Sabha constituency in Maharashtra as a member of the Shiv Sena (SS) political party. He resigned from Shiv Sena and joined the BJP on 9 November 2014. Since June 2016, he has represented Andhra Pradesh in the Rajya Sabha. He is also the founding Chancellor of Rishihood University. He is also a visiting professor at London School of Economics

Education and career
Suresh Prabhu completed his schooling from Sharadashram Vidya Mandir, Dadar, Mumbai, followed by a Bachelor in Commerce with Honours from M. L. Dahanukar College, Vile Parle, Mumbai. He received a Bachelor in Law degree from the New Law College (Ruparel College campus), Mumbai. Prabhu is a Chartered Accountant and a member of the Institute of Chartered Accountants of India. He was All India 11th (eleventh) rank holder in CA exams.

Prabhu has held several government and semi government positions, which includes the Chairmanship of Maharashtra State Finance Commission, Saraswat Co-operative Bank, National Cooperative Development Corporation (India) Member of the Maharashtra Tourism Development Board, among others. He is a part of 16 global organizations and 9 strategic dialogues which include:
 Global Water Partnership
 GLOBE, UK
 World Economic Forum (WEF)
 Global Industries Council
 UN Advisor
 United Nations Development Program (UNDP)
 United Nations Industrial Development Organization (UNIDO)
 Global Forum For Farmers, President
 Strategic Dialogues
 Coordinating Committee for International Voluntary Service
 Skolkovo Foundation
 Asia Energy Forum
 United Nations Committee of Biodiversity
 World Federation of UNESCO

Currently, he is a member of the Board of Advisors of India's International Movement to Unite Nations (I.I.M.U.N.). He is a chairman of the National Cooperative Development Corporation (India)

Early political career
He was, at various times during the Premiership of Atal Bihari Vajpayee from 1998 to 2004, Industry Minister, Minister of Environment and Forests, Minister of Fertilizers & Chemicals, Power, Railways, Commerce and Industry and Civil Aviation. Currently a Member of Rajya Sabha from Andhra Pradesh, he has been a Member of Lok Sabha in the 11th, 12th, 13th and 14th Lok Sabha between 1996 and 2009. His constituency comprised the district of Sindhudurg and parts of Ratnagiri district in the state of Maharashtra on the western coast of India. He was also a Member of Rajya Sabha representing Haryana and Andhra Pradesh.

Union Cabinet Minister

Union Minister for Industry (1996)

As Industries Minister, brought about greater transparency in functioning  and fuel clearance of pending works.

Union Minister For Environment and Forests (1998-99)

 Instrumental in preparation of a comprehensive National Environment Action Plan having time bound programs for abatement of pollution in the country
 Introduced 100% centrally funded Schemes for reducing pollution in 22 major cities of India
 Introduced unleaded petrol in National Capital Territory to control pollution levels
 Instrumental in setting up of Indian Centre for the Promotion of Cleaner Technologies (ICPC) in association with the World Bank, industries, academic institution and other agencies
 Formed Environment Surveillance Squads in the Central Pollution Control Board to enforce pollution control systems on polluting industries

Left a lasting imprint in areas like:

Environment Clearances

 Streamlined procedures for environmental clearances and introduced transparency by bringing all works regarding environment and forest clearances on Internet
 Instrumental in strengthening the monitoring system for achieving better compliance of stipulated conditions in environmental clearances
 Issued notification to make Environmental Impact Assessment compulsory for 29 developmental activities
 Instrumental in project involving Asian Development Bank for strengthening Environment Impact Assessment and Environment Legislation

Legislative Initiatives

 Instrumental in preparation of a draft Biological Diversity Act for conservation, sustainable utilization and equitable sharing of biological resources
 Finalized the Hazardous Waste Management Rules, Solid Waste Management Rules & Biomedical Waste Management Rules
 Prepared draft "Recycled Plastics Usage Rules" which envisaged prohibiting/restricting the use of plastics
 Examined the Municipal Solid Wastes (Management and Handling) Rules

Conservation of Natural Resources

 Prepared a detailed action plan for achieving 33% forest cover in the country
 Set up the National Committee for identification of Eco-sensitive zones
 Launched the Bamboo Development Plan for the country, signed multiple treaties with INBAR and Konkan Bamboo and Cane Development Centre
 Revised Project "Modern Forest Fire Control Methods" to effectively prevent forest fire incidents in the country
 Launched the National Natural Resources Management System (NNRMS) scheme with the objective of utilizing remote sensing technology to monitor natural resources and facilitate sustainable development
 Made Joint Forest Management (JFM) system an integral part of all forestry projects. Created Joint Forest Management Cell to monitor implementation
 Prepared proposal for centrally sponsored ‘Integrated Forest Protection Scheme’
 Prepared National Perspective plan to rehabilitate the forest and non forest wastelands
 Created an Environment Fund to plough back the fines collected for violation of environmental laws
 Successfully ran a nationwide awareness campaign for forest and environment conservation
 Created protection squads in all Project Tiger areas affected by insurgency
 Banned export of antlers of deer and 29 species of medicinal plants
 Financial assistance provided to 28 National Parks and 107 sanctuaries in 23 states
 Launched Project Turtle, a new initiative for the conservation of the Olive Ridley Turtle
 Prepared proposal for Biodiversity Diversity Act after a detailed and transparent consultative process
 Proposed setting up of a Biodiversity Information Network
 Several initiatives taken to improve implementation of Ganga Action Plan and National River Conservation Plan

Union Power Minister (2000-02)

As the Union Minister for Power, he won praise for his performance from The Indian Express. As Minister of Power, he ushered in transformational policies in Power sector with thrust on rural-electrification, T&D reforms; encouraged big ticket investments and batted for Sustainable Power Development, etc. mentioned as under:

Power Generation Augmentation

 Prepared an action plan for creation of an additional capacity of 1,00,000 MW to give power on demand by 2012
 Executed resource planning for building additional power generation capacity. Took steps to set up alternate payment security mechanism for the investors as an interim resource mobilization strategy
 Set up Power Projects Monitoring Committee  to expedite speed of commissioning of generation facilities
 Renovation and Modernization action plan formulated for 170 thermal power units and 35 hydro units with total generation capacity of 14,000MW

Policy Measures

 Executed resource planning for building additional power generation capacity. Took steps to set up alternate payment security mechanism for the investors as an interim resource mobilization strategy
 Initiatives taken which resulted in signing of MoUs with States for undertaking reforms and restructuring in a time bound manner
 Instrumental in the implementation of the landmark tripartite agreement which allowed the Union government to recover the amounts due from the states by deducting them from central devolution
 Executed the Accelerated Power Development Program (APDP)
 Implemented a special aid package under the Accelerated Power Development Program for the reforming States in order to encourage distribution reforms
 Formed National Power Grid to enable power transfer from power surplus regions to power deficit regions and enable optimal development and utilization of coal and hydro resources economically
 Undertook policy measures to accelerate hydro power development by laying emphasis on basin-wise development

Chairperson, Task Force for Interlinking of Rivers (2002-04)

 Chaired the comprehensive program of Government of India aimed at insuring the country against water stress through linkage of major rivers in the Himalayan and Peninsular regions of the country
 Steered the Task Force towards making an action plan for completion of the feasibility studies and providing guidance on norms of appraisal of individual projects in respect of socio-economic impacts, environmental impacts and economic viability
 Prepared ground for reaching consensus with the concerned State Governments on the program of interlinking of rivers

Union Railway Minister (2014-17)

On 9 November 2014, he was sworn in as Cabinet minister in the Narendra Modi government. He was the Union Railway Minister of India from November 2014 to September 2017.

 Introduced one of the world's cheapest travel insurance plan for passengers which has now been made free of cost
 The Indian railways was deployed for sending disaster relief supplies at an unprecedented scale.

 Jaldoot water trains were sent to drought hit areas of Maharashtra
 Roll on Roll off was used to address fuel crisis in the North East
 Food grains were supplied in the form of ready to eat food packets to major parts of North East and most parts of Assam

 ‘VIKALP’, Alternative Train Accommodation System (ATAS) launched with a view to provide confirmed accommodation to waitlisted passengers 
 Launched an integrated mobile app for all Railway related services 
 High speed free Wi-Fi launched at 140+ stations
 Launched new catering policy 
 155,949 additional berths made available in last 3 years through coach augmentation
 Took many initiatives for Divyangs: Braille signage, toilets, E-wheelchair, battery operated cars, policy allowing Divyangs to avail concession even while travelling without escort Janani Sewa launched to provide services to mothers of infants
 Introduced Single person accountability introduced for all facilities on trains
 Launched Mission Retrofit to revamp 40,000 coaches
 In a bid to enhance consumer experience initiated installation of elevators and escalators at stations along with widening of footover bridges Initiated the process of installing CCTV cameras in ladies compartment to boost security
 100% FDI allowed in identified areas of railway sector
 Initiated merger of rail budget with general budget as part of reform agenda
 Chaired various Roundtable discussions to reach out to Railways’ stakeholders, seek and incorporate their feedback

Infrastructure Creation: Grave traction to speedy Creation of Infrastructure in Railways

 Substantially increased the average km broad gauge lines commissioned to 7.7 km/day against past average of 4.3 km/day
 Commissioned highest ever 45 freight terminals in 2016–17 with total of 109 in last three years
 Commissioned highest ever 1306 Road Over Bridges and subways in 2016–17, total 3,486 in last 3 years
 Leading Station Redevelopment Program: Largest transit oriented development program across the world worth ₹1,00,000 crores to redevelop 400 stations
 Launched Final Location survey for BG line rail connectivity for the Chardham Pilgrimage
 Final Location survey for BG line rail connectivity between Manali and Leh
 Piloted Mumbai Urban Transport Project (MUTP) - Phase III project to augment infra in Mumbai suburban rail
 Effected direct procurement of about 750 MW of power by Ministry of Railways under Open Access, reduction in Traction power bill of ₹1400 crores
 Provided 69,200 bio-toilets in trains in the last three years, record number of 34078 Bio Toilets provided in 2016-17
 New Water policy launched for restoration of water bodies, establishing water recycling plants, rain water harvesting, efficient water usage, automatic coach washing plants etc.
 Launched Mission 41K to achieve savings of ₹41k crores through energy efficiency
 10 MW Solar Plants installed. Massive solarisation (1000 MW Solar Power Plants) planned 
 Expanded the scope and expedited the implementation of accounting reforms in Indian Railways
 Process of transfers and postings in key positions made absolutely transparent
 Effected monitoring of zonal railways through MoUs based on quantifiable performance parameters 
 Launched "Nivaran", an online platform for employees to lodge their grievances
 Eliminated Interviews for all recruitments for Staff at Group C & D level

Union Commerce & Industry Minister (2017-19)

He has been the minister of Commerce and Industry since September 2017. He was elected as Rajya Sabha member from the state of Andhra Pradesh on 3 June 2016. During his tenure, he took several steps to boost manufacturing in India.  Details of few major reforms are as under:

Boosting domestic manufacturing at the district level to achieve US$5 trillion economy

 Initiated the Start- the pilot District Level Development plan in six districts across five states with a focus on interventions critical to boosting manufacturing at the district level
 Initiated the process of introducing the EODB framework at the district Level

Trade promotion: Taking steps towards a more focused approach towards export promotion

 Drove policies which resulted in India registering its highest ever merchandise exports of over US$330 billion in 2018-19
 Achieved a massive US$10 billion cut in trade deficit with China in 1 year; this was the first time in 30 years that trade deficit with China reduced
 Introduced India's 1st ever Agriculture Export Policy to address barriers in the agricultural sector; the policy is aimed at doubling the agricultural exports in 2018 to US$60 billion by 2022
 Achieved a 97% resolution rate of grievances received from the domestic exporter community through digitization in the first year
 Working on the introduction of a State Led Export Policy in a bid to boost trade related cooperative federalism
 Created a high-level group of experts committee to create out of the box approaches to contemporary scenarios of trade.
 Earmarked ₹ 5,000 crores to boost exports across 12 Champion Services Sectors 

Pivoting multilateralism on India

 Continuous efforts towards making India a focal point in new power dynamics in trade multilateralism; organized a special mini Ministerial WTO meet in India

Investment Promotion

 Reinforcing the efforts towards increasing the Ease of Doing Business in India for both foreign and domestic players. India now ranks first in Ease of Doing Business report among South Asian countries as compared to 6th in 2014. India now ranks 77 in the World Bank's EODB ranking, leaping up by 23 ranks.
 In the last four years, India has received FDI worth 263 billion US dollars which is 45 percent of the FDI received in the last 18 years.
 Focus on improving District Level EODB with a target of achieving an additional GDP growth of 2-3 percent at the district level.
 Drove investments into 35 alternative investment funds by mobilizing a ~USD 1.5 billions corpus for startups aimed at boosting entrepreneurship across India

Pillar of Support for Indian Manufacturing

 Initiated the pilot District Level Development plan in six districts across five states with a focus on interventions critical to boosting manufacturing at the district level. Start-up India is a flagship initiative of the Government of India, intended to build a strong ecosystem that is conducive for the growth of start-up businesses, to drive sustainable economic growth and generate large scale employment opportunities. The number of recognized startups by the Ministry crossed 15,000. Total employment generated because of that has been for over 130,000 persons.
 Launched an intensive market access campaign for GI, in order to give a fillip to the grassroot entrepreneurs and manufacturing of local goods. Total number of products carrying GI tags increased to ~300 and GI specific stores were opened at airports across India
 Working on creating a master plan for Make in India 2.0 with to boost domestic manufacturing with an ultimate target of creating a million plus jobs in the next year
 Domestic Council for Gems & Jewellery launched
 Launched SEZ 2.0 policy framework under the chairmanship of Sh. Baba Kalyani, chairman, Bharat Forge
 Made key policies for greater flow of credit to the export sector

Committed to Technology, Innovation skills and known for path breaking initiatives, particularly in Railways and Power

 Setting up a dedicated Data Analytics Unit under the ministry, which will assist decision makers at the top level in driving short-term and long-term data/ evidence driven policy making
 Government e-Marketplace (GeM) was set up as the National Public Procurement Portal in August 2016 for facilitating completely online and transparent system for procurement of goods and services. GeM platform saw transactions worth ₹ 17,500 crores in last 2 years, resulting in an average saving of 25-28%

Forward looking Policy Making

 Initiated the development of India's New Industrial Policy with a focus on boosting sustainable manufacturing in India
 Initiated the development of India's first ever National e-Commerce Policy
 Created an action-oriented plan to further diversify the economy with an eye on future sustainability
 Created a plan for mainstreaming the use of technology in across every aspect of governance
 Implemented the strategy for enhancing market access for Indian GIS
 Implemented a new age IPR policy to enhance the IPR regime in India

Union Civil Aviation Minister (2018-19)
Policy Making

 Released India's first ever National Air Cargo Policy
 Released Maintenance, Repair and Overhaul (MRO) Policy
 Released National Green Aviation Policy
 Released Drone Policy

Initiator of Investments in Aviation

 Drove the implementation of the regional connectivity scheme or UDAN - More than 12 lakh passengers flown under UDAN until 31 January 2019. In 28 months of UDAN, 69 unserved airports, 31 helicopters and 6 water drones were awarded.
 AIR SEWA 2.0 - Upgraded passenger grievance redressal portal AirSewa 2.0 launched in 2018. 96% of the passenger grievances, lodged through Passenger Grievance Portal Air Sewa, were resolved
 DIGIYATRA - Digi Yatra is a new initiative of the Ministry to provide hassle-free travel of passengers through airport all the way to the aircraft. The Digi Yatra is to be implemented shortly at six airports by Airports Authority of India.
 Digi Sky – In the process of setting up an online platform for registering and grant of permit for drones, held the first ever Global Aviation Meet aimed at identifying interventions to boost aircraft manufacturing in India
 NABH - Working on a pan India Airport Modernization Plan
 Facilitating the implementation of setting up of water aerodromes across five states in the country

Awards and recognition
Suresh Prabhu received the Goud Saraswat Brahmin Samaj Maharatha Award on 18 August 2016.

He has constantly featured in the list of top five ministers in India from 2014 to 2017 in terms of both performance and accessibility in nationwide surveys conducted by various institutions.
 Awarded 'Indian of the Year 2017.
 Declared "Best Member of Parliament in 13th Lok Sabha" in April 2004 by Aaj Tak, a leading TV Channel in India.
 Featured amongst top three Indian leaders of the future in the cover story, "Giant on the Move" (Sept 2000 issue) of the Hong Kong-based Asiaweek Magazine.
 Ranked as the 2nd best performing Minister in India Today's report (dated 27 August 2001) on the performance of key ministers of Government of India.

Published works 
 "Students' Unrest" at the Jamnalal Bajaj Institute of Management, Mumbai.
 "Causes and Consequences of Mass Unemployment of Youths" at the Central Committee for International Voluntary Services (CCIVS), UNESCO, Paris.
 "Problems of Youth in Third World Countries" at CCIVS, Monrovia (Liberia).
 "North-South Co-operation", paper read at an international seminar at New Delhi on behalf of Bharat Sevak Samaj.
 "Contribution of NGO's Towards Peace" - Asian Youth Seminar, New Delhi.
 Has published several columns on finance and economy in the daily "Mid-Day" as well as articles in leading Marathi dailies.
 He has written extensively on socio-economic issues.

Social Work and interests 
 Former Chairman, Saraswat Co-operation Bank. (former Chairman)
 Former Director, National Co-Operative Union of India
 Chairman, Manav Sadhan Vikas Sansthan, an NGO
 Former Chairman, Konkan Kala academy
 Former Trustee, Mumbai Marathi Granth Sangrahalaya
 Former Chairman, Adult Education Institute
 Former Chairman, Maharastra State Table Tennis Academy
 Trustee, Khar Residents Association
 Former Trustee, Manavendra Charitable hospital
 Former Trustee, IFFCO Foundation
 Senior Vice-president, Table Tennis Federation of India (present)
 Advisory Board Member, Eco Needs Foundation and its Eco Revolution movement

See also
 2015 Railway Budget of India
 2016 Railway Budget of India

References

External links

 
 Detailed Profile: Suresh Prabhu

 

1953 births
Living people
Railway Ministers of India
University of Mumbai alumni
India MPs 1996–1997
India MPs 1998–1999
India MPs 1999–2004
India MPs 2004–2009
People from Ratnagiri
Marathi politicians
Indian accountants
Lok Sabha members from Maharashtra
Shiv Sena politicians
Bharatiya Janata Party politicians from Maharashtra
Rajya Sabha members from Haryana
Narendra Modi ministry
Rajya Sabha members from Andhra Pradesh
Ministers of Power of India
Commerce and Industry Ministers of India